Alexander Gammerman is a Russian computer scientist, and professor at Royal Holloway University of London. He is the co-inventor of conformal prediction. He is the founding director of the Centre for Machine Learning at Royal Holloway, University of London, and a Fellow of the Royal Statistical Society.

Career
Gammerman's academic career has been pursued in two countries: Russia and the United Kingdom. He started working as a Research Fellow in the Agrophysical Research Institute, St. Petersburg. By the late 1980s, he emigrated to the United Kingdom and was appointed as a lecturer in the Computer Science Department at Heriot-Watt University, Edinburgh. Together with Roger Thatcher, Gammerman published several articles on Bayesian inference. He was appointed to the established chair in Computer Science at University of London tenable at Royal Holloway and Bedford New College, where he served as the Head of Computer Science department from 1995 to 2005. In 1998, the Centre for Reliable Machine Learning was established, and Gammerman became the first director of the centre.

Gammerman has published 7 books, more than 150 research papers, and has an estimated h-index of 34.

Honours and awards
In 1996, Gammerman received the P.W. Allen Award from the Forensic Science Society. In 2006, he became a Honorary Professor, at University College London. In 2009, he became a Distinguished Professor at Complutense University de Madrid, Spain. In 2019, he received a research grant funded by the energy company Centrica about predicting the time to the next failure of equipment. In 2020, he received the Amazon Research Award for the project titled Conformal Martingales for Change-Point Detection

Selected books
 Measures of Complexity (2016), Springer, .
 Algorithmic Learning in a Random World (2005), Springer, .
 Causal Models and Intelligent Data Management (1999), Springer, .
 Probabilistic Reasoning and Bayesian Belief Networks (1998), Nelson Thornes Ltd, .
 Computational Learning and Probabilistic Reasoning (1996), Wiley, .

References

External links
 Gammerman's University Website

Living people
Machine learning researchers
Soviet computer scientists
Soviet mathematicians
British mathematicians
British computer scientists
Academics of Royal Holloway, University of London
Soviet emigrants to the United Kingdom
Fellows of the Royal Statistical Society
Artificial intelligence researchers
1949 births
Date of birth missing (living people)
Academics of Heriot-Watt University